The Ouessant (or Ushant) is a breed of domestic sheep from the island of Ouessant off the coast of Brittany. It is one of the Northern European short-tailed sheep breeds, together with several other types from Great Britain, Scandinavia and Germany. Also occasionally called the Breton Dwarf, it is one of the smallest breeds of sheep in the world. They are currently being raised in a number of European countries including Germany, France, and Great Britain. In North America they are beginning to be bred in Massachusetts, and raised in California.

Most Ouessant are black or dark brown in color, but white individuals do occur. The rams have relatively large horns, and ewes are polled. The Ouessant existed exclusively on its home island until the beginning of the 20th century, and is still a rare breed today. Ewes rarely produce twins, and the breed is primarily used for wool production. In Paris, the city government recently began using a small herd of Ouessant sheep to graze public lands.

References

External links

Sheep breeds
Sheep breeds originating in France
Ushant